Kenrickodes titanica is a species of moth in the family Noctuidae first described by George Hampson in 1910. It is found in central Madagascar and in South Africa.

References 

Condicinae
Moths of Madagascar
Moths of Africa
Moths described in 1910